The 1998 Monte Carlo Open was a men's tennis tournament played on outdoor clay courts. It was the 92nd edition of the Monte Carlo Open, and was part of the ATP Masters Series of the 1998 ATP Tour. It took place at the Monte Carlo Country Club in Roquebrune-Cap-Martin, France, near Monte Carlo, Monaco, from 20 April through 26 April 1998.

Fourteenth-seeded Carlos Moyá won the singles title.

Finals

Singles

 Carlos Moyá defeated  Cédric Pioline, 6–3, 6–0, 7–5
It was Carlos Moyá's 1st title of the year, and his 4th overall. It was his 1st Masters title of the year, and overall.

Doubles

 Jacco Eltingh /  Paul Haarhuis defeated  Todd Woodbridge /  Mark Woodforde, 6–4, 6–2

References

External links
 
 ATP tournament profile
 ITF tournament edition details

 
Monte Carlo Open
Monte-Carlo Masters
1998 in Monégasque sport
Monte